Spice SE90 may refer to:
Spice SE90C, a group C sports prototype racing car
Spice SE90P, an IMSA GTP sports prototype racing car